Vaya is the fourth EP by American post-hardcore band At the Drive-In, released in 1999.

Writing
"198d" was written about drummer Tony Hajjar's grandmother, who was buried in a mass grave in Lebanon. The title was taken from an inscription on her gravestone. 

The sound of the album bridges the musical gap between In/Casino/Out and their following album, Relationship of Command.

Artwork
The EP's cover features a Conion 100CF boombox which belonged to the band, and was used as a frequent prop during Vaya period, appearing in their photoshoots, gig flyers and on stage during most of their live performances. Additionally, it would appear in the music video for "Metronome Arthritis" and was later featured on the label of their 2000 split 7-inch with The Murder City Devils as well as the cover of the 2005 compilation album This Station Is Non-Operational.

Release
The EP was first released in 1999 by Fearless Records. To promote it, the band toured with Rage Against the Machine and the Foo Fighters in November and December 1999. It saw a limited of 500 vinyl release at 2012's Coachella Music Festival to celebrate the band's first performances together in 11 years. The 10-inch was then re-released as a hot-pink vinyl on June 5, 2012, with 1,500 copies in North American and 1,500 copies elsewhere. A vibrant red edition of 1,000 of the 10-inch was also available from Hot Topic stores.

Track listing
"Rascuache" – 3:21
"Proxima Centauri" – 2:46
"Ursa Minor" – 3:22
"Heliotrope" – 3:12
"Metronome Arthritis" – 4:00
"300 MHz" – 3:03
"198d" – 4:04

Personnel

 ATDI
Cedric Bixler-Zavala – lead vocals, percussion
Jim Ward – guitars, keyboards, vocals
Omar Rodríguez-López – guitars
Paul Hinojos – bass guitar
Tony Hajjar – drums, percussion

 Another personnel
Sean Cummings – production
Alex Newport – production, recording engineer, mixing 
Mike Major – production, recording engineer, mixing
Justin Leah – recording engineer
Bobby Torres – recording engineer
John Matousek – mastering
Rick Robot – photography
Paul Drake – photography
Joe D Foster – layout

Chart performance

References

1999 EPs
At the Drive-In EPs
Fearless Records EPs
Post-hardcore EPs